The Department of Liquor Control is a South Dakota state government agency which is responsible for licensing certain operations and for collecting certain state taxes.  These taxes include cigarette excise, estate, bank franchise, ore, energy mineral severance, coin-operated laundromat license fees, beer, wine and distilled spirits, gaming excise, beer and liquor license fees, and alcohol beverage brand registration fees. It is also responsible for the sales and property tax refund program for the elderly and disabled.

See also 
 South Dakota v. Wayfair, Inc.

References

External links 
Special Tax Division official website

State alcohol agencies of the United States
State agencies of South Dakota
US state tax agencies